{{DISPLAYTITLE:E∞}}
E∞ or E-infinity may refer to:

E-infinity ring, a commutative ring construct in homotopy theory
E∞-operad, a set of contractible maps that are commutative and associative
E-infinity theory, a fringe fractal cosmology proposed by Mohamed El Naschie